Mario Garín Fernández (born 26 April 1992) is a Spanish field hockey player who plays as a goalkeeper for División de Honor club El Tenis and the Spanish national team.

Club career
Garín played for RS Tenis and Complutense before he joined Real Club de Polo in 2015. He left Real Club de Polo in 2019 to play for Club de Campo. In 2022 returned to his boyhood club El Tenis.

International career
Garín made his debut for the senior national team in 2013. He represented Spain at the 2018 World Cup. At the 2019 EuroHockey Championship, he won his first medal with the senior team as they finished second. On 25 May 2021, he was selected in the squad for the 2021 EuroHockey Championship.

References

External links

1992 births
Living people
Sportspeople from Santander, Spain
Spanish male field hockey players
Male field hockey goalkeepers
2014 Men's Hockey World Cup players
2018 Men's Hockey World Cup players
Real Club de Polo de Barcelona players
Club de Campo Villa de Madrid players
División de Honor de Hockey Hierba players
2023 Men's FIH Hockey World Cup players